Marie Frédéric Marc Soudois (14 February 1865 – 20 August 1914) was a French fencer. He competed in the men's foil event at the 1900 Summer Olympics.

Personal life
Soudois served as a capitaine (captain) in the 344th Infantry Regiment of the French Army during the First World War and was killed in action in Moselle on 20 August 1914.

References

External links
 

1865 births
1914 deaths
French male foil fencers
Olympic fencers of France
Fencers at the 1900 Summer Olympics
Sportspeople from Charente-Maritime
French military personnel killed in World War I
French Army officers